The Technological University of Panama, Universidad Tecnológica de Panamá (UTP) in Spanish, is the second largest university in Panama. It comprises six schools and has seven regional campuses nationwide. The main campus is a  piece of land in Panama City, the country's capital.

History 

The Universidad Tecnológica de Panamá (UTP) is the highest hierarchy public institution, regarding higher education in Panama. It was formerly the Engineering School of the University of Panama, which in 1975 became the Polytechnic Institute and, due to the need of a new model of university, became the Universidad Tecnológica de Panamá, by means of Law 18 of August 13, 1981.

On October 9, 1984 the Universidad Tecnológica de Panamá was definitively organized by means of Law 17. Law 57 of July 26, 1996 modifies and adds to Law 17 of 1984.

Since the class of 1981, the nation has received uninterruptedly the delivery of more than 43,000 professionals from the UTP; their knowledge, skills and vision contribute to the development of the Republic of Panama. UTP started with six bachelor's degrees and 15 technical careers. Currently it offers 43 advanced careers, 28 bachelor's degrees and 21 technical careers.

The synergy created with the Panamanian Government, private sector and society allows the UTP to maintain a state of the art academic offer and to contribute efficiently with the technological and social development of the country.  Valuable links developed with prestigious academic institutions, research centers, organizations and corporations of other countries, ensure a successful participation in the global village.

Its current academic offer is the best evidence of institutional growth. There are 131 careers at different levels, as follows: 2 Doctorate studies, 40 master's degrees, 26 postgraduate courses, 1 Professor Career, 4 Specializations, 8 Diplomas, 14 Bachelor's degrees in Engineering, 14 Bachelor's degrees, 8 Bachelor's degrees in Technology and 14 Technical careers. Regarding demand, it has increased from 5,735 students on 1981 to 18,000 on 2011.

It has a Faculty of 1,234 professors, 30% of them teaching full-time and an administrative crew of 1,200 people. UTP is the national leader in engineering research; and a reference point of expertise in technology.

Organization 
 President/Rector
 Academic Vice-Rector
 Administrative Vice-Rector
 Research, Postgraduate Affairs and Extension Vice-Rector 
 Registrar's Office 
 University Planning 
 Government Organisms
 General University Council 
 Academic Council 
 Research, Postgraduate Affairs and Extension Council 
 Administrative Council

Schools 

 Civil Engineering 
 Electrical Engineering 
 Industrial Engineering 
 Mechanical Engineering 
 Computer Systems Engineering 
 Science and Technology

Branches 

 Panama City
 Metropolitan Campus “Dr. Víctor Levi Sasso”
 Howard
 Tocumen
 Azuero Regional Center 
 Bocas del Toro Regional Center
 Cocle Regional Center 
 Colon Regional Center
 Chiriqui Regional Center 
 Western Panama Regional Center
 Veraguas Regional Center

Research centres 

 Engineering Experimental Center (CEI)
 Project Center 
 Agricultural Production and Research Center (CEPIA) 
 Hydraulic and Hydrotechnical Research Center (CIHH)[
 Research, Development and Innovation in Information and Communications Technology Center

Communications 

 Radar Newsletter, publication for the students 
 Boletín Dirección de Relaciones Internacionales
 UTP in motion newsletter
 El Tecnológico magazine 
 PRISMA Tecnológico magazine 
 I+D Tecnológico magazine 
 Tecnología Hoy magazine

Cultural affairs 

 Book and Magazine Launch
 Cultural Magazine MAGA 
 Literature Week
 "Rogelio Sinán" Central American Prize
 "José María Sánchez" Short Story National Prize
 MAGA Short Story Prize
 “Pablo Neruda” National Poetry Prize
 Creative Writing Diploma

Services 

 Bookstore and Distribution Center  
 Library 
 Engineering Career Certification
 Others

External links 
Official website (in Spanish)

Universities in Panama
Buildings and structures in Panama City
Education in Panama City